Lianna de la Caridad Montero Herrera (born 21 January 1998) is a Cuban freestyle wrestler. She is a bronze medalist at the World Wrestling Championships and the Pan American Games. She also won the gold medal in her event at the 2018 Central American and Caribbean Games held in Barranquilla, Colombia.

Career 

In 2016, she competed in the women's 53 kg event at the 2016 Pan American Wrestling Olympic Qualification Tournament without qualifying for the 2016 Summer Olympics in Rio de Janeiro, Brazil. She won her first match against Giullia Penalber of Brazil but she lost her next match against Betzabeth Argüello of Venezuela. Montero went on to win one of the bronze medals in the competition.

In 2018, she won the silver medal in the 57 kg event at the 2018 Pan American Wrestling Championships held in Lima, Peru. At the 2018 Central American and Caribbean Games held in Barranquilla, Colombia, she defeated Nes Marie Rodríguez of Puerto Rico in the final and she won the gold medal in the 57 kg event. Later that year, she also won one of the bronze medals in the 55 kg event at the 2018 World Wrestling Championships held in Budapest, Hungary. In her bronze medal match she defeated Jacarra Winchester of the United States.

In 2019, she represented Cuba at the 2019 Pan American Games in Lima, Peru and she won one of the bronze medals in the 53 kg event. She also competed in the 53 kg event at the 2019 World Wrestling Championships in Nur-Sultan, Kazakhstan without winning a medal. She was eliminated in the repechage by Roksana Zasina of Poland. In 2020, she won one of the bronze medals in the 53 kg event at the 2020 Pan American Wrestling Championships held in Ottawa, Canada.

In March 2020, she qualified to represent Cuba at the 2020 Summer Olympics at the 2020 Pan American Wrestling Olympic Qualification Tournament held in Ottawa, Canada. However, she did not compete and Laura Hérin competed in the women's 53 kg event instead.

Major results

References

External links 
 

Living people
1998 births
Place of birth missing (living people)
Cuban female sport wrestlers
World Wrestling Championships medalists
Pan American Games medalists in wrestling
Pan American Games bronze medalists for Cuba
Medalists at the 2019 Pan American Games
Wrestlers at the 2019 Pan American Games
Central American and Caribbean Games gold medalists for Cuba
Competitors at the 2018 Central American and Caribbean Games
Central American and Caribbean Games medalists in wrestling
Pan American Wrestling Championships medalists
20th-century Cuban women
21st-century Cuban women